This is a list of High Sheriffs of Lincolnshire.

The High Sheriff is the oldest secular office under the Crown.  Formerly the High Sheriff was the principal law enforcement officer in the county but over the centuries most of the responsibilities associated with the post have been transferred elsewhere or are now defunct, so that its functions are now largely ceremonial.  The High Sheriff changes every March.

Between 1974 and 1996 the shrievalty in Lincolnshire was interrupted when the County of Humberside took over the complete northern part of the county. In 1996 the northern bailiwicks reverted to Lincolnshire once more, after eight North Lincolnshire based High Sheriffs of Humberside had administered the area.

10th to 12th century
Thorold
Alwin
Thorold
c.1066–1068: Merleswein 
1068–: Ivo de Taillebois
?-1115: Osbert
1115-: Wigod
c1129: Rainer of Bath
1130s: Hacon
1154: Rainer of Bath
1155: Jordan of Blossevilla
1156–1162: Walter de Amundevel
1163–1164: Peter de Gossa
1165: William de Lisle
1166 Aluredus de Poiltona
1167–1168: Philip de Kyme
1169–1170: Walter of Grimesby
1171–1174: Walter and Aluredus de Poiltona
1175–1176: Drogo, son of Radulph
1177–1183: William Basset of Sapcote, Leics
1184–1187: Nigel, son of Alexander
1189: Gerard de Camville and Roger de Stikewald
1190: Gerard de Camville
1191: William de Stuteville
1191–1192: Gerard de Camville and Roger de Stikewald
1193: Gerard de Camville and Eustatius de Hedenham
1194: Simon de Kyme and Peter de Trehanton
1195–1196: Simon de Kyme and Peter of Beckering and Robert de Trehanton
1197: Philip son of Robert
1199: Robert de Tatteshall

13th century

14th century

15th century

16th century

17th century

18th century

19th century

20th century

Present century

Notes

References

Bibliography
 White, E.A., Armytage, G.J. (eds.) (1897). The Baptismal, Marriage, and Burial Registers of the Cathedral Church ... of Durham: 1609-1896 (Harleian Society Publications, Register Series, vol. xxiii)

 
Lincolnshire
History of Lincolnshire
Local government in Lincolnshire
High Sheriffs